Numerous video games were released in 2010. Many awards went to games such as Red Dead Redemption, Assassin's Creed: Brotherhood, Mass Effect 2, God of War III and Super Mario Galaxy 2. Kinect from Microsoft Game Studios for the Xbox 360 was also released this year.

Critically acclaimed titles
Metacritic (MC) and GameRankings (GR) are aggregators of video game journalism reviews.

Best-selling video games 
The following titles were the top five best-selling family video games worldwide in 2010.

Events

Console releases
The list of game consoles released in 2010 in North America.

Series with new entries
Series with new installments in 2010 include Ace Attorney, Alien vs. Predator, Army of Two, Assassin's Creed, Battlefield, BioShock, Call of Duty, Castlevania, Civilization, Crackdown, Donkey Kong, Darksiders,  Dead Rising, Fable, Fallout, God of War, Gran Turismo, Grand Theft Auto, Halo, Just Cause, Kane and Lynch, Lost Planet, Mafia, Mass Effect, Medal of Honor, Mega Man, Metroid, Need for Speed, Pokémon, Prince of Persia, Red Dead, Red Steel, Resident Evil, Skate, StarCraft, Star Wars: The Force Unleashed, Super Mario, Super Monkey Ball, Tom Clancy's H.A.W.X, Tom Clancy's Splinter Cell and Total War.

In addition, 2010 saw the introduction of several new properties, including Alan Wake, Darksiders, Deadly Premonition, Heavy Rain, and Metro.

Game releases
The list of games released in 2010 in North America.

See also
2010 in games

References

 
Video games by year